A party favor is a small gift given to the guests at a party as a gesture of thanks for their attendance, a memento of the occasion, or simply as an aid to frivolity.

Occasions 
It is traditional in some Western cultures for the guests at bridal showers and weddings to receive party favors; these vary in price and durability in accordance with the desires and budget of the host or hostess. This practice has spread to many other formal occasions such as baby showers, engagement parties, retirement parties, anniversaries, and holiday gatherings.

For small social gatherings such as birthday parties, guests may receive a simple and inexpensive favor such as a small toy. In some cases guests might receive a small "gift bag", or "party bag" with a handful of favors, toys or trinkets, candy, pencils or other small gifts.  Occasions such as birthday parties, seasonal parties, unique events such as a Bar/Bat Mitzvah or Christening are a few social gatherings where favors may be appropriate.

At weddings

Wedding favors are small gifts given as a gesture of appreciation or gratitude to guests from the bride and groom during a wedding ceremony or a wedding reception.  
 
The tradition of distributing wedding favors is hundreds of years old.  It is believed that the first wedding favor, common amongst European aristocrats, was known as a bonbonniere.  A bonbonniere is a small trinket box that was made of crystal, porcelain, and/or precious stones.  The contents of these precious boxes were generally sugar cubes or delicate confections, which symbolize wealth and royalty. 
 
As sugar became more affordable, bonbonnieres were replaced with almonds.  For centuries, almonds were commonly distributed to wedding guests to signify well wishes on the bridegroom’s new life.  In the thirteenth century, almonds coated with sugar, known as confetti, were introduced.  Confetti soon transformed to sugared almonds, which started in ancient Greece and was inspired by the tale of Demophon, the king of Athens whose wife died and reincarnated as an almond tree. This later evolved into a wedding favor for modern day weddings. Traditionally, five Jordan almonds are presented in a confection box or wrapped in elegant fabric to represent fertility, longevity, wealth, health and happiness.  The bitterness of the almond and the sweetness of the coated candy are a metaphor for the bitter sweetness of a marriage.
 
Today, gifts to guests are commonly known as wedding favors and are shared in cultures worldwide.  Wedding favors have become a part of wedding reception planning, especially in the United States and Canada.  Wedding favors are diverse and usually complement the theme or season of the event.  Classic favors can range from the classic sugared almonds or individual chocolates to candles and scented soaps.  Modern gift trends include: CDs with the favorite music of the bride and groom, shot glasses filled with colored candy or a charitable donation in the name of their guests.  Gifts may also be personalized with the couple's or guest's names, initials or the wedding date.

Making or buying 
The choice of favors is personal to the hosts, who might make or buy party favors for their event.  The main factors in this decision are budget, the number of guests, the longevity or shelf life of the chosen favor, and the time available for making or shopping for favors.  The longevity of the favor depends on whether or not it is edible or would otherwise spoil, such as fresh flowers.

Other items considered party favors 
Party favors may also refer to ephemeral items which help partygoers celebrate, but which are not meant to be lasting souvenirs. Examples include but are not limited to party hats, balloons, noisemakers, party horns (paper tubes that unroll when blown into), Christmas crackers, plastic leis, glow sticks, deely bobbers, and streamers and other kinds of confetti.

 
Wedding gifts